This is a list of television anthology series that have had episodes spun off into full-blown series.  Sometimes these spin-offs were deliberately made as backdoor television pilots.

References

Television spin-offs
T